Vaad Rabonei Lubavitch is an executive committee of Chabad-Lubavitch rabbis which oversees Halachic and Jewish legal decisions in Chabad. Its headquarters is in Brooklyn, New York.

Members

Current 
 Rabbi Moshe Bogomilsky
 Rabbi Nochem Kaplan

Past 
 Rabbi Chaim Meir Bukiet
 Rabbi Yisroel Friedman
 Rabbi Zelig Sharfstein

References

External links
 Vaad Rabonei Lubavitch
 Message From Vaad Rabonei Lubavitch
 NEW YORK, USA. CHABAD CENTERS IN BROOKLYN, NEW YORK:

Chabad in the United States
Rabbinical organizations
Chabad organizations